Conversocial is a provider of social customer service software headquartered in New York City and founded in London. Companies such as Google, Barclaycard, Hertz, Tesco, Sainsbury's, Volkswagen and University of Phoenix use Conversocial's Software as a Service to manage the flow of customer service inquiries and discussions on social media channels.

History 
Joshua March & Dan Lester founded Conversocial in November 2009 in London. After , which they sold to social media marketing company Betapond in 2012, March has focused solely on Conversocial.

In February 2016, Twitter announced that Conversocial is a Twitter Official Partner, and is working with the company to add deep messaging deep links to tweets.

In February 2017, Twitter announced that would deepen its partnership with Conversocial for greater growth and monetization in the area of social customer service.

Funding 
In 2012 Conversocial expanded to the USA, opening its headquarters in Manhattan, New York.

In 2013, Conversocial received $4.4 million in additional funding from a round led by Octopus Ventures.

In 2014, Conversocial received $5 million in additional funding from a round led by Octopus Ventures.

In 2015, Conversocial received $11 million in additional funding from a round led by Dawn Capital.

Product 
Conversocial is a real-time social media management system which allows companies to provide customer support through Facebook and Twitter. Conversocial's functions include:

 Priority Response Engine – The self-learning prioritization engine uses natural language processing and analysis of historic responses to prioritise messages.
 Conversation History
 Team Management – Conversocial's collaborative platform lets teams share social communication, while management retains control of social platforms.
 Analytics & Reporting – Measures important data such as customer satisfaction, agent response times, and issue frequency.

Leadership 
CEO Joshua March has appeared on CNBC, Bloomberg, Fox Business, and BBC as a commentator on customer service and social media, and was named one of 2012’s Top 10 Hottest Digital Marketers by iMedia Connection. Josh March frequently writes about social media and customer service, and his work has been featured in numerous business and technology publications.

Previously Joshua and Dan Lester co-founded , a social app development company, which was acquired by Betapond in September 2012. From 2008 to 2010 Joshua was the Chairman of the Facebook Developer Garage London, an official Facebook event running monthly for developers, entrepreneurs and marketers working on the Facebook platform, which he helped found in 2007.

Awards and recognition 
Most recently, Conversocial was named a "cool vendor" in the CRM Customer Service and Social Report published by leading analyst firm Gartner The UK publication V3 has also named Conversocial one of Top 10 up-and-coming UK technology start-ups for 2013.

In 2010 Conversocial won "Highly Commended" in the Best Platform category of TechCrunch's The Europas- European Startup Awards. In 2011, Conversocial was the overall winner  in the Best Advertising or Marketing Tech Startup category, and in 2013 they were "Highly Commended" in the Best Advertising or Marketing Tech Startup.

References

External links 
 Conversocial

Software companies established in 2009
Software companies based in New York City
Business software
Social networking services
Reputation management
Social information processing
Defunct software companies of the United States
2009 establishments in England